George "Boogie" Preston Ambler(born March 8, 1950) is an American politician who served as a Delegate from the 42nd District to the West Virginia House of Delegates between 2013 and 2019. Ambler is a Republican.

Early life, education, and career
Ambler was born in Alderson, West Virginia. He earned his Bachelor of Science degree from Bluefield State College.

Elections

2012
In his first primary election, Ambler was one of two Republicans, the other being Ray Canterbury, to be sent to the general in a three-way race, receiving 26.22% of the vote.

In a four-way general election, Ambler was elected with Canterbury, receiving 23.17% of the vote.

2014
Like in 2012, Ambler was sent to the general with Canterbury, receiving 44.75% of the vote.

In the general, Ambler was reelected alongside Canterbury, receiving 28.88% of the vote.

2016
In the 2016 primary, Ambler received 44.95% of the vote.

In the general, Ambler received 33.59% of the vote to be elected alongside Democrat Stephen Baldwin.

2018
In 2018, Ambler sought the nomination for West Virginia's 10th Senate district, where the incumbent was not seeking reelection. In the primary, he defeated Republican Dan Hill with 56.45% of the vote.

In the general, Ambler faced fellow 42nd District Delegate Stephen Baldwin and lost with 46.85% of the vote. He left his office as Delegate from the 42nd District thereafter.

Tenure

Committee assignments

2013 session
Roads and Transportation
Education
Agriculture

2015 session
Agriculture and Natural Resources (Vice chair)
Education
Energy
Roads and Transportation

2017 session
Agriculture and Natural Resources (Vice chair)
Finance
Roads and Transportation

Flooding
Ambler was appointed the House Chairman of the newly created Joint Legislative Committee on Flooding in response to the 2016 West Virginia flood and sponsored several pieces of legislation pertaining to flooding in West Virginia.

Candidate Ratings
In 2018, Ambler had a 93% rating from the American Conservative Union and a 76% lifetime rating.

Ambler also had a 84.6% rating from the West Virginia division of the United States Chamber of Commerce in 2018.

In 2016, Ambler had only a 10% rating from the West Virginia chapter of the Sierra Club.

Personal life
Ambler is married to Vicky Ambler and has two children. He is a Methodist.

References

External links
George Ambler at Ballotpedia

1950 births
Living people
Bluefield State College alumni
Republican Party members of the West Virginia House of Delegates
People from Alderson, West Virginia
21st-century American politicians